PayCash is a Russian electronic payment platform for making anonymous Internet purchases with cash via kiosks.

The system is based on the technology proposed in the eighties by Dutch David Chaum. PayCash is developed by CJSC "Processing Technologies" and JSC «Aerospace Equipment Corporation», with the financial support from Tavrichesky Bank. PayCash owns 4 patents on technologies used in the system.

Several major projects are implemented based on the PayCash technology:
 Yandex.Money, payment system, currency is Russian ruble 
 E-port (acquired by Qiwi),  Russian payment service provider
 MOBI.Money, payment services
 MonetaExpress, money transfer system
 iDealer (acquired by ), a network of automated kiosks for accepting payments in Russia and Ukraine
 iDram, payment system, currency is Armenian dram
 CyberCheck, payment system
 MegaFon, payment system
 MTS. payment system
 Ozon.ru, payment system
 7-Eleven, payment system

References

Payment systems
E-commerce in Russia